A large number of people from Ireland have competed at the Olympic Games for a country other than Ireland. Given the size of the Irish diaspora, particularly Irish Americans and the Irish migration to Britain, it was common for such emigrants to represent their adopted nations. The first independent Irish team at the Olympics appeared in the 1924 Paris Games, with Irish athletes previously competing for Great Britain.

Irish Olympians for other nations
NB: This list excludes people who identify as Northern Irish and have competed for Great Britain at the Olympics, Northern Ireland being part of the United Kingdom.
Dan Ahearn
Tim Ahearne
Edward Barrett
John Barrett
John Beresford
John Pius Boland
John Carpenter
James Clarke
James Brendan Connolly
Denis St. George Daly
John Daly
Dennis Fenton
John Flanagan
Patrick Flynn
Bryan Fowler
Johnny Hayes
Beatrice Hill-Lowe
Denis Horgan
Robert Kerr
Tom Kiely
Con Leahy
Patrick Leahy
Joe Lydon
Harold Mahony
George Mayberry
Ken McArthur
Pat McDonald
Matt McGrath
Joshua Millner
James Mitchel
Peter O'Connor
Con O'Kelly
James Cecil Parke
Derek Porter
Noel Purcell
Patrick Ryan
Martin Sheridan
Con Walsh

References

Olympics
 
Ireland, other